The 1981 Dutch Grand Prix was a Formula One motor race held at Zandvoort on 30 August 1981. It was the twelfth race of the 1981 Formula One World Championship.

The 72-lap race was won from pole position by Alain Prost, driving a Renault. Nelson Piquet finished second in a Brabham-Ford, with Alan Jones third in a Williams-Ford. With Carlos Reutemann failing to finish in the other Williams-Ford after colliding with Jacques Laffite's Ligier-Matra, Piquet moved into the lead of the Drivers' Championship, with the same number of points as Reutemann but more wins.

Qualifying report 

The Fittipaldi team returned after missing the previous race in Austria due to a lack of engines. However both their drivers, Keke Rosberg and Chico Serra, failed to qualify.

For the fourth consecutive race, the Renaults filled the front row, with Alain Prost 0.079 seconds ahead of René Arnoux. Nelson Piquet was third in his Brabham, followed by the two Williams of Alan Jones and Carlos Reutemann and the Ligier of Jacques Laffite. The top ten was completed by Mario Andretti in the Alfa Romeo, John Watson in the McLaren, Elio de Angelis in the Lotus and Riccardo Patrese in the Arrows.

Qualifying classification

Race report 

At the start, Prost led the field into Tarzan, with teammate Arnoux following closely behind. Further back in the midfield, Gilles Villeneuve crashed his Ferrari into the back of Bruno Giacomelli's Alfa Romeo, vaulting over the Alfa before spinning out of the race.

As the field wound toward the second corner, Andretti and Reutemann collided, leaving Andretti's car with a broken nose. Before the end of the first lap, another incident occurred when Patrick Tambay in the second Ligier and Didier Pironi in the second Ferrari came together. Tambay retired instantly, whilst Pironi carried on for three more laps before also pulling out of the race.

At the front of the field, Arnoux was unable to keep up with the pace and dropped four places, behind Jones, Piquet, Laffite and Reutemann. With Arnoux out of the way, Jones hunted down Prost and challenged for the lead until his tyres wore out and Jones had to slow down. Reutemann and Laffite, in the meantime, battled fiercely for fourth, ending with both cars crashing out of the race on the 18th lap.

Toward the end of the race, a slowing Jones was overtaken by Piquet. This would prove to be crucial in the World Championship standings, for if Jones had kept second, Piquet would have missed out on the title at the final race of the season.

Race classification

Championship standings after the race

Drivers' Championship standings

Constructors' Championship standings

References

Dutch Grand Prix
Dutch Grand Prix
Grand Prix
Dutch Grand Prix